Banana War can refer to:

Banana Wars, a series of U.S. military interventions in the 1890s
Bonanno War, a 1960s Mafia dispute, sometimes called "the Banana War"
a 1974 economic dispute with the Union of Banana Exporting Countries, known as a "banana war"